The Heritage Property Act is a provincial statute which allows for the identification, protection and rehabilitation of cultural heritage properties in the province of Nova Scotia, Canada.

The Act offers five types of protection:
 Provincial Registry of Heritage Properties (a list of properties designated by the provincial Minister of Communities, Culture and Heritage as possessing provincially significant heritage value);
 Provincial Cultural Landscape (a cultural landscape listed on the Provincial Registry);
 Municipal Registries of Heritage Properties (a list of properties which the local municipality has determined have a local or community level of heritage value);
 Municipal Heritage Conservation Districts (a specific area within a municipality having unique heritage value and subject to regulations intended to ensure the preservation of the district's character while accommodating new development); and
 Municipal Cultural Landscapes (a cultural landscape listed on a Municipal Registry).

The Heritage Property Act was first enacted in 1980, and was subject to amendments in 1991, 1998 and 2010.

Nova Scotia also has related legislation to protect archaeological and natural sites (the Special Places Protection Act) and to protect burial plots and cemeteries (the Cemeteries Protection Act).

See also
Heritage conservation in Canada
List of historic places in Nova Scotia
List of National Historic Sites of Canada in Nova Scotia

References

External links
Heritage Property Act
Canadian Register of Historic Places, search for sites designated under the Heritage Protection Act

 Heritage Property Act
Heritage Property Act
Nova Scotia
1989 in Canadian law
1980s in Nova Scotia
Housing legislation in Canada